Freemans Bay is the name of a former bay and now inner city suburb of Auckland, in the North Island of New Zealand. The bay has been filled in to a considerable extent, with the reclamation area now totally concealing the ancient shoreline. Historically a poor and often disreputable quarter, it is now a comparatively wealthy and desirable neighbourhood known for its mix of heritage homes and more recent single-dwelling houses, as well as for its two large parks.

Demographics

Freemans Bay had a population of 4,407 at the 2018 New Zealand census, an increase of 201 people (4.8%) since the 2013 census, and an increase of 576 people (15.0%) since the 2006 census. There were 1,920 households, comprising 2,196 males and 2,208 females, giving a sex ratio of 0.99 males per female. The median age was 36.9 years (compared with 37.4 years nationally), with 399 people (9.1%) aged under 15 years, 1,116 (25.3%) aged 15 to 29, 2,370 (53.8%) aged 30 to 64, and 522 (11.8%) aged 65 or older.

Ethnicities were 80.1% European/Pākehā, 7.9% Māori, 5.4% Pacific peoples, 11.7% Asian, and 4.6% other ethnicities. People may identify with more than one ethnicity.

The percentage of people born overseas was 35.0, compared with 27.1% nationally.

Although some people chose not to answer the census's question about religious affiliation, 59.3% had no religion, 28.4% were Christian, 0.2% had Māori religious beliefs, 1.4% were Hindu, 1.2% were Muslim, 1.0% were Buddhist and 3.1% had other religions.

Of those at least 15 years old, 2,073 (51.7%) people had a bachelor's or higher degree, and 210 (5.2%) people had no formal qualifications. The median income was $54,600, compared with $31,800 nationally. 1,560 people (38.9%) earned over $70,000 compared to 17.2% nationally. The employment status of those at least 15 was that 2,520 (62.9%) people were employed full-time, 489 (12.2%) were part-time, and 117 (2.9%) were unemployed.

Geography 

Since the turn of the 20th century, extensive land reclamation (partly using stone quarried from nearby headlands) has seen Freemans Bay itself disappear. The reclamation of the old bay was finished in 1901, and Victoria Park was created on most of the resulting flat area. It is still public land used mostly for sports purposes.

The coastline shifted more than one kilometre to the northwest of the city centre and is now composed of the concrete wharves of Viaduct Basin and the Tank Farm or as it is now renamed, the Wynyard Quarter.

History

Māori origins

Waiatarau (or 'Reflecting Waters') was the Māori name for the bay that is now Victoria Park, although other names were used to refer to the area; such as Wai Kōtota ('The place where the cockles are harvested') and Te Koranga ('The scaffolds', referring to the racks upon which fish would be hung to dry in the sun). A stream called Waikuta ('Waters of the reed') discharged into the south eastern corner of the bay (bottom of College Hill Road) while the Tunamau ('To catch eels') stream came down from what is now Western Park and met the bay at the bottom of what is now Franklin Road. The headland at the western side of the bay was called Te Tō, and was a seasonal fishing pā used by Tāmaki Māori. Te Tō was occupied by 18th century Waiohua paramount chief Kiwi Tāmaki during the shark hunting season on the Waitematā Harbour.

European name

Freemans Bay is one of the earliest settled areas in Auckland, and was earmarked for development and land reclamation in the 1840s by Colonial Surveyor Felton Matthew who laid out the streets along the shores of the local bays. During the early colonial era, the bay was known by Māori as Waipiro Bay, due to the large amounts of rum consumed there.

Freemans Bay is probably named after Captain William Hobson's secretary, James Stuart Freeman who apparently lived in the area. He was described by Dr John Logan Campbell in 1844 as "the most disgustingly immoral swindling scoundrel in town". Local gossip had it that he was not actually married to the woman he was living with, or that there was something amiss in her past.

Industry and slums

While settled as one of the earliest parts of the country by Europeans, the area was never seen as a desirable place to live. The rich favoured the other side of Queen Street, clustering around the governor's mansion (where the university is now located) and enjoying views of the harbour and Rangitoto, this was even referred to as the 'right side' of Queen Street.

On the "wrong side of Queen Street" were located most of the smelly and noisy industries including the abattoir and the gasworks of the Auckland Gas Company. As well as brickworks, by 1883 the area was the location of nine shipyards, three sawmills, a brass and iron foundry, a glassworks, an asphalt works, as well as several coal and lime traders. Also found here were several public facilities like the city morgue, a night soil dump and from 1905 the city rubbish incinerator (known as the 'Destructor', which became Victoria Park Market and was rebranded as Victoria Park Village in 2017).

Around these occupations were gathered some of the more modest houses in 19th century Auckland. Two land auctions in 1864 in this area were the "Brookville" estate (121 sites) and "Alma Place" (152 sites). The large number of building sites are probably an indication of the very small size of the building sections. These workers cottages were built very close together and often poorly constructed, sometimes being little better than hovels with dirt floors. Not all the housing in the area was so modest, however; on Franklin Road, which rises up the hill towards the Ponsonby ridge, were built larger houses, including several two storied houses, and in 1873 the street was beautified by the City Council by planting it with plane trees. Many of these larger houses subsequently became boarding establishments for male workers from the adjacent industries.

In 1910 the average house for sale on Franklin Road was advertised for £736, while the average house in Victoria Road, Remuera, was considered worth £1279 at the time. 
In 1905 Victoria Park was created which included sports grounds, a sports pavilion and a children's playground. The playground equipment was donated by Mr John Court of the John Court Department Store. In 1909 a kindergarten for the local children was opened. It soon ran into financial problems, however, from which it was rescued by Dr John Logan Campbell. The brick building stood for many years unused, recently restored by Auckland Council and NZTA as part of the works around the Victoria Park Tunnel. During the 1918 flu epidemic, the sports pavilion was used as a depot for corpses awaiting transportation by rail to the city cemeteries.

Urban renewal

As a working class area, Freemans Bay was greatly affected by the Great Depression. By 1930, the percentage of unskilled workers amongst the male population of Freemans Bay had risen to 39%, whereas in affluent Remuera it was only 2%. Conversely, only 11% of all males of Freemans Bay worked in "white-collar" or "business and professional" roles, whereas in Remuera the same percentage had grown to 86% by that time, a sign of the increasing homogenisation of Auckland suburbs.

Freemans Bay was seen as a centre of crime, prostitution, sedition and Union Activity. There were also concerns about it being a source of infectious diseases, including plague and tuberculosis. In the 1930s, the Auckland City Council set up a committee called "The Decadent Areas Committee" (later renamed as the "Housing Committee") largely to deal with the area. In the 1930s and 1940s, many Māori who moved into the city looking for work came to live in the cheap housing of the area. This pattern was repeated in the 1950s and 1960s when Pacific Islanders arrived in New Zealand seeking employment as well.

During the Second World War, Victoria Park was commandeered and covered with a military camp for the American Armed Forces. The adjacent areas St Mary's Bay and Freemans Bay became notorious as the location of many brothels along with illicit drinking and gambling establishments. Many of the women in the area were keen to have fun with the American troops who were known to be generous with money, cigarettes and nylon stockings. The distinction made by the authorities and most respectable people between a female being a 'loose woman' and being a prostitute was pretty vague. St Mary's Bay was known for being more expensive and tended to cater for the officers, while Freeman's Bay was for the lower end of the market. This reputation clung to the area after the war.

In 1951, the Auckland City Council declared a 96 hectare area of Freemans Bay as an area for urban development, and planned to replace the entire housing stock with medium-density housing, destroying the homes of over 7,000 people in the process. While this did not come to pass, several developments of flats and townhouses were built in the 1960s and 1970s, such as along Whitson Terrace. LDuring the 1980s and 1990s, the remaining Victorian houses began to be gentrified along with the neighbouring suburbs of Ponsonby and St Marys Bay and they are now some of Auckland's most fashionable and desirable residences.

On Victoria Street opposite Victoria Park stands a group of brick Edwardian industrial buildings. Built between 1905 & 1915 and known as "the Destructor", this facility generated electricity by burning the city's rubbish. Opened by the Mayor Arthur Myers, this facility was closed in 1972, and in 1983 it was converted into a market called Victoria Park Market, latterly rebranded as Victoria Park Village.

Behind Victoria Park Village is the Drake hotel which sits at a slightly higher level than the Village, Victoria Street and the park. This shows the outline of the ancient sea cliff. From 1905 onwards, Freemans Bay was filled in to create the park. After 1919 the reclamations continued and the area north of the park was created to provide more wharf area for the expanding Ports of Auckland. This included the Lighter Basin to the east and Wynyard Wharf to the west.

From 2000 to 2003, the Lighter Basin was redeveloped as the Viaduct Basin, which served as a headquarters for the various yachting syndicates involved in the America's Cup campaigns of 2000 and 2003. The area is now an upper-class (multi-story) residential area. On the adjacent Fanshawe Street, previously dilapidated warehouses have been replaced by new prestigious office blocks, including Vodafone New Zealand. The Wynyard Quarter is also undergoing a great deal of redevelopment, which includes the new Silo Park.

The suburb is now home to a much more affluent populace, with the 2006 median income at $41,400, much higher than the $26,800 average Auckland-wide. Around 32% of all residents live in single-person households, some in the many former Council and State Housing flats still existing in the area, though the housing stock is varied.

Notable buildings

 The Drake Hotel. This Victorian pub stands on the ancient sea cliff of the bay. The current structure replaced an earlier building which stood directly adjacent to the quayside where the ships were moored.
 Victoria Park Village. Built between 1905 and 1915 as the city's rubbish incinerator and known as 'The Destructor' this building was opened by Mayor Arthur Myers. Until the 1950s this complex generated electricity by burning organic rubbish. In 1973 it was decommissioned and destined to be demolished. After a decade of standing vacant the brick Edwardian buildings were reopened as Victoria Park Market in 1983.
 Former Campbell Kindergarten. Situated on the southern boundary of Victoria Park this brick structure was paid for by Sir John Logan Campbell. After the kindergarten moved to a more modern building this became the headquarters for the local cricket club and the rugby league team. After they moved to the newly rebuilt Sports Pavilion on the north side of the park in the 1990s the building stood derelict for many years. Recently renovated as part of the Victoria Park Tunnel project.
 Birdcage Hotel – The Birdcage, formerly the Rob Roy Hotel is a Victorian pub built in 1885–1886. When it opened this pub stood directly on the quayside. From 1912 onwards the bay to the north was filled in and Victoria Park created. The Birdcage is registered by the NZHPT (Category II, No.636) and is scheduled on the District Plan (Category B). The Birdcage is situated on the corner of Franklin Road and Drake Street opposite Victoria Park Village. In order to preserve this building of high heritage significance, the decision was made to shift the Birdcage (excluding the basement) to a new site 40m along Franklin Road. The building was relocated slightly north of its original location following completion of the tunnel in 2011.
 Former Gasworks – Beaumont Street. Elegant Edwardian brick buildings which have been converted into retail spaces and apartments. This set of buildings included a number of metal Gas Holders which have not survived.
 Former Caretakers Cottage – north-east corner of Victoria Park. Arts & Crafts style cottage – recently restored and now operating as a cafe.
 Sports Pavilion – 1990s replacement for the Edwardian structure. Here bodies of people who had died in the 1918 flu pandemic were stored before being transported to a mass grave at the Municipal Burial Ground at Waikumete Cemetery in West Auckland by train.
 Former St Patrick's School – Wellington Street. Once occupied by McDonald's New Zealand as their Headquarters.
 Bushell's Shop – Wellington Street. Last remaining shop from the shopping precinct demolished by Auckland City Council. Distinguished by a large advertisement for Bushells Tea, recently defaced by the present owners in a botched restoration.
 Freemans Bay Community Centre – Hepburn Street. 1970s building by Auckland City Council. This hall opened in 1977 and came close to demolition after being badly damaged by a fire in 1999. After extensive refurbishment it was re-opened in April 2000.
 Sheridan Square – 1970s town house development by Auckland City Council.
 Auckland Girls' Grammar School – Howe Street. Brick Art & Crafts building built in 1909 but incorporating buildings from an earlier primary school. On the site of the 19th century Immigration Barracks. www.aggs.school.nz/
 17 Hepburn Street. Large 19th century wooden Italianate residence built for Henry Elliot.
 Te Kainga Aroha, 29 Hepburn Street. 1890s wooden house in the Queen Anne Style built for Andrew Entrican, a Deputy Mayor of Auckland. Since the 1940s this house has been the location of the Interdenominational United Maori Mission Girls Hostel; Te Kainga Aroha.
 Queens Hall, 9 Paget Street. Brick and stucco concert hall built in the 1880s by a doting father so his daughter would have somewhere to sing.
 18 Paget St. Cottage at the centre of a heritage controversy. Apparently an 1850s structure moved here from Albert Park ridge. www.nzherald.co.nz/nz/news/article.cfm?c_id=1&objectid=...
 Currie Residence – 50 Wood St. Wooden house from around 1900. Designed and built by architect John Currie as his own home. Currie was a carpenter before becoming an architect.
 Blomfield House – 40 Wood Street. Built as the home of the well-known landscape painter Charles Blomfield (artist). This two storeyed wooden Italianate house was constructed by Charles' brother Samuel, reputedly from a single kauri tree.
 McGregor House – 2 Franklin Road. Distinctive wooden Turret House built for one of Alexander McGregor's sons. Now Ponsonby Backpackers. McGregor senior lived next door in 'Holmdene', a brick and stucco mansion on Ponsonby Road.
 Sinclair House – 68 Franklin Road. Two storeyed 19th century brick house with verandahs – unusual in an area where the Victorian houses are predominantly single storeyed and wooden. The television presenter Peter Sinclair owned this house in the 1970s-1980s.

Education

Close by local State secondary schools are Auckland Girls' Grammar School and the Catholic St Paul's College for boys and St Mary's College for girls.

References

Auckland's Original Shoreline – Campbell, Nerida; Heart of the City, 2005
The Lively Capital, Auckland 1840-1865 – Platts, Una; Avon Fine Prints Limited, New Zealand 1971

External links
Photographs of Freemans Bay held in Auckland Libraries' heritage collections.

Suburbs of Auckland
Waitematā Local Board Area
Waitematā Harbour